The index finger (also referred to as forefinger, first finger, second finger, pointer finger, trigger finger, digitus secundus, digitus II, and many other terms) is the second digit of a human hand. It is located between the thumb and the middle finger. It is usually the most dextrous and sensitive digit of the hand, though not the longest. It is shorter than the middle finger, and may be shorter or longer than the ring finger (see digit ratio).

Anatomy 
"Index finger" literally means "pointing finger", from the same Latin source as indicate; its anatomical names are "index finger" and "second digit".

The index finger has three phalanges. It does not contain any muscles, but is controlled by muscles in the hand by attachments of tendons to the bones.

Uses
A lone index finger held vertically is often used to represent the number 1 (but finger counting differs across cultures), or when held up or moved side to side (finger-wagging), it can be an admonitory gesture. With the hand held palm out and the thumb and middle fingers touching, it represents the letter d in the American Sign Language alphabet.

Pointing
Pointing with the pointer finger may be used to indicate or identify an item, person, place or object.

Around age one, babies begin pointing to communicate relatively complex thoughts, including interest, desire, and information. Pointing in human babies can demonstrate the theory of mind, or ability to understand what other people are thinking. This gesture may form one basis for the development of human language. 

Non-human primates, lacking the ability to formulate ideas about what others are thinking, use pointing in much less complex ways. However, corvids, dogs and elephants do understand finger pointing.

In some cultures, particularly the Malays and Javanese in Southeast Asia, pointing using index finger is considered rude, hence the thumb is used instead.

Index finger in Islam 
In Islam raising the index finger signifies the Tawhīd (تَوْحِيد), which denotes the indivisible oneness of God. It is used to express the unity of God ("there is no god but Allah"). 

In Arabic, the index or fore finger is called musabbiḥa (مُسَبِّحة), mostly used with the definite article: al-musabbiḥa (الْمُسَبِّحة). Sometimes also as-sabbāḥa (السَّبّاحة) is used. The Arabic verb سَبَّحَ - which shares the same root as the Arabic word for index finger - means to praise or glorify God by saying: "Subḥāna Allāh" (سُبْحانَ الله)

Index finger in archaeoastronomy 
Before the advent of GPS and compass, early humans used index finger for pointing direction of objects with the help of stellar objects during night time.

Gestures in art
As an artistic convention, the index finger pointing at the viewer is in the form of a command or summons.  Two famous examples of this are recruiting posters used during World War I by the United Kingdom and the United States.

The index finger pointing up is a sign of teaching authority.  This is shown in the depiction of Plato in the School of Athens by Raphael.

See also
 Digit ratio, comparative lengths of the index finger and ring finger and androgen levels in utero
 Extensor indicis muscle
 Fingering (disambiguation)
 Index (typography)

References

External links

Gestures
Fingers